Standard Time is the debut album by former Wings guitarist Laurence Juber, released in 1982 on vinyl and re-released digital. Some of the songs were recorded when Juber was still a member of Wings. For instance, "Maisie" was recorded during the Back to the Egg sessions. Fellow Wings members Paul McCartney, Denny Laine and Steve Holley also performed on the album.

Track listing 
Side one
 "Four Brothers" (Jimmy Giuffre) – 3:39
 "Dinah" (Harry Akst, Sam M. Lewis, Joe Young) – 3:11
 "Maisie" (Laurence Juber) – 2:12

Side two
"After You've Gone" (Turner Layton, Henry Creamer) – 3:24
 "Stormy Weather" (Harold Arlen, Ted Koehler) – 5:11
 "The Christmas Song" (Mel Tormé, Robert Wells) – 2:54

"Maisie" would later re-appear in a different version on the 1993 album Naked Guitar as "Maise".

Personnel 
Laurence Juber – guitar
Joy Yates – vocals on "Dinah"
Paul McCartney – bass on "Maisie"
Steve Holley – drums on "Maisie"
Denny Laine – harmonica on "Maisie"
Paul Hart – piano on "After You've Gone"
Chris Lawrence – bass on "Stormy Weather"
Ricard Niles/David Katz – orchestra on "Stormy Weather"
Production notes:
Laurence Juber – producer
Richard Niles – producer
Mike Stavrou – engineer
Hope Juber – art direction
LB Studios, inc. - photography
Recorded at Abbey Road Studios and Air Studios London

References 

Laurence Juber albums
1982 debut albums
Albums recorded at AIR Studios